Marion Queenie Kirker (1879 - 1971) was a New Zealand photographer. Her work is held in the collection of the Museum of New Zealand Te Papa Tongarewa.

Biography 
Kirker was born in Auckland in 1879. She left New Zealand in the mid-1920s and moved to London to learn the Bromoil printmaking process. Using this process she was able to creatively manipulate the look of her prints. In 1937 she became a member of the Royal Photographic Society and later the same year was elected to Associate membership. In 1938 she was awarded a medal by the Cripplegate Photographic Society in their annual print competition.

Kirker later returned to New Zealand and began using a Paxette camera to produce work in the new colour snapshot format.

Kirker died in 1971.

References

1879 births
1971 deaths
People from Auckland
New Zealand photographers
New Zealand women photographers
20th-century photographers
20th-century New Zealand artists
20th-century New Zealand women artists
20th-century women photographers
Photographers from Auckland